La Luna: Live in Concert is a live concert recording by Sarah Brightman, inspired by her La Luna album. The performance in Sunrise, Florida was recorded and filmed on October 4, 2000 and has been released on DVD and VHS in spring 2001. Brightman performs her 1997 hit "There for Me" with singer Josh Groban. Special features included are the music video for "A Whiter Shade of Pale", a multipart documentary covering the making of the La Luna album and tour, a behind-the-scenes tour documentary, an interview, and an interactive tour map.

Track listing

Certifications

References

External links 
 

Concert films
Sarah Brightman albums
2001 live albums
2001 video albums
Live video albums